Totally Country Vol. 2 is an album in the Totally Hits series, which features 17 country singles from 2000 to 2002.

Track listing
 "Modern Day Bonnie and Clyde" – Travis Tritt (4:44)
 "I Breathe In, I Breathe Out" – Chris Cagle (4:03)
 "Just What I Do" – Trick Pony (3:21)
 "My Town" – Montgomery Gentry (4:26)
 "Carlene" – Phil Vassar (3:29)
 "She'll Leave You with a Smile" – George Strait (3:24)
 "But for the Grace of God" – Keith Urban (4:32)
 "Just Let Me Be In Love" – Tracy Byrd (3:02)
 "Ol' Red" – Blake Shelton (3:42)
 "Life Happened" – Tammy Cochran (4:27)
 "The One" – Gary Allan (4:19)
 "She Was" – Mark Chesnutt (3:21)
 "Wrapped Around" – Brad Paisley (3:22)
 "The Impossible" – Joe Nichols (4:06)
 "I Don't Want You to Go" – Carolyn Dawn Johnson (4:33)
 "I'm Movin' On" – Rascal Flatts (3:48)
 "Ashes by Now" – Lee Ann Womack (4:12)

Charts

Weekly charts

Year-end charts

Certifications

References

Totally Country
2002 compilation albums